Vahid Asgari (born March 20, 1985) is an Iranian football defender.

Career
Asgari is a part of Aboomoslem squad since 2006. He joined Aluminium in summer 2011.

Club Career Statistics

References

External links 
Vahid Asgari at PersianLeague.com

Sportspeople from Mashhad
Iranian footballers
Association football defenders
F.C. Aboomoslem players
Aluminium Hormozgan F.C. players
Shahr Khodro F.C. players
1985 births
Living people